Aurora is Susumu Hirasawa's fourth solo album.

Overview
His first main solo album in three years following a period where focus was directed on the Defrosted P-Model, Aurora, which Hirasawa has said can be considered a second solo debut, is a turning point in his career. Unlike the previous solo albums, Aurora doesn't feature guest musicians, with almost all instrumentation handled by MIDI-compatible devices. The music was composed with the Amiga The Blue Ribbon SoundWorks programs Bars & Pipes Professional, which he started using for "more natural orchestration", and SuperJAM!, whose "Bartok" style he modified by inputting data from his own songs, irreversibly turning its patterns and variations into "Hirasawa" style ones.

Aurora was created to appeal to the instinctual side of the listener as opposed to the logical, in likeness to tales and myths, emphasizing vocals and melody. The songs were written so that the album would lack any inherent story or concept, inviting the listener to create their own reading. Hirasawa wanted to avoid that if at all possible, but felt that was just the way the language worked and left it as is. Many words representing natural phenomena were included in an attempt to resolve complaints about the lyrics being opaque. Hirasawa chose words that were easy to understand and had a large impact, the word Aurora came from this decision as well.

The album's booklet is adorned with Buddhist imagery. Advertisements for Aurora used the phrase .

Track listing

The official translations of the titles of the songs are stylized in all uppercase letters.
"Snow Blind" contains a sample of "Oh Mama!" by P-Model, from the album One Pattern.

Personnel
Susumu Hirasawa - vocals, electric guitar (Talbo), acoustic guitar (Yairi), synthesizers (E-mu Proteus/2, Korg MS-20, Korg M1R, Roland JD-800), sampler (Akai S1100), drum machine (Roland R-8 with DANCE card), Amiga (2500), sequencer (Bars&Pipes Professional), programming, production

technical
Masanori Chinzei - recording, mixing
Motohiro Yamada (Eggs Shep Studio), Harumi Ōta (MIX), Tsutomu Okada (MIX) - assistant engineering
Masao Nakazato (Onkio Haus) - mastering

visuals
Kiyoshi Inagaki (d.d.t.) - art direction, design
Hideki Namai - photography
Akemi Tsujitani - styling
Kazunori Yoshida - hair & make-up

operations
Roppei Iwagami (Pre-Octave) - publishing
I3 Promotion
Yūichi Kenjo - co-production
Masami Fujii - publicity coordination
Koosuke Mogi - artist management
Takeshi Fujita - personal management
Polydor K.K.
Osamu Takeuchi - direction
Tomohide Ishikawa - A&R chief
Hitoshi Maeda - executive production

Thanks
Gallery LS for Mandala (スーナムギャムフォ), Fernandes

Release history

"Love Song", "Aurora", "Song of the Force" and "Snow Blind" are included in the NEW SONGS FROM AURORA promotional sampler.
"Love Song", "Aurora" and "In the Square" are included on the Archetype | 1989-1995 Polydor years of Hirasawa compilation.
"Island Door (Paranesian Circle)" is included in the vinyl release of the Ruiner Original Soundtrack.

References

External links
 
 AURORA at iTunes Japan
 AURORA at amazon.co.jp

Susumu Hirasawa albums
Japanese-language albums
1994 albums
Polydor Records albums